The Anthony Awards are literary awards for mystery writers presented at the Bouchercon World Mystery Convention since 1986. The awards are named for Anthony Boucher (1911–1968), one of the founders of the Mystery Writers of America. Among the most prestigious awards in the world of mystery writers, the Anthony Awards have helped boost the careers of many recipients.

Categories
Awards are voted for by members attending the annual event and are given in the following categories:
 Novel
 First Novel
 Paperback Original
 Short Story
 Critical / Non-fiction Work
 Special Service award
The ceremony may also include a number of "wild card" awards.

Winners

1980s

1990s

2000s

2010s

2020s

References

External links 
 Official website of Bouchercon World Mystery Convention

 
Mystery and detective fiction awards
American literary awards
Awards established in 1986
Bouchercon
 
 
1986 establishments in the United States
Anthony Boucher